Rupayatan is a residency school at Bhavnath, Junagadh in Gujarat, India.

Rupayatan was founded by Ratubhai Adani, a well known freedom fighter. Now Rupayatan has Bal Bhavan Center too. Rupayatan gives the free education to students. Rupayatan arranges many programs related to Gujarati Literature. Rupayatan Bal Bhavan wins the National Values Award from National Bal Bhavan, Delhi.

Schools in Gujarat
Junagadh district